The 2012 Abu Dhabi Grand Prix (formally the 2012 Formula 1 Etihad Airways Abu Dhabi Grand Prix) was a Formula One motor race held on 4 November 2012 at the Yas Marina Circuit, Yas Island, Abu Dhabi, United Arab Emirates. It was the eighteenth round of the 2012 Formula One season and the fourth Abu Dhabi Grand Prix. The 55-lap race was won by Lotus driver Kimi Räikkönen after starting from fourth position. Fernando Alonso finished second in a Ferrari with his championship rival Sebastian Vettel third for Red Bull, starting from the pit lane.

The victory was Räikkönen's first of the season, his first since he returned to Formula One at the start of the year, and his first since 2009. It was the first time a Lotus had won a race since Ayrton Senna's victory in Detroit in 1987. Alonso's second place allowed him to narrow the gap to Vettel in the Drivers' Championship to ten points. Räikkönen's radio communications during the race were widely reported, particularly his comment to his engineer on lap 23: “Just leave me alone, I know what to do.”

Report

Background
The Grand Prix was contested by twelve teams with two drivers each. The teams (also known as constructors) were Red Bull, McLaren, Ferrari, Mercedes, Lotus, Force India, Sauber, Toro Rosso, Williams, Caterham, HRT and Marussia. Tyre supplier Pirelli brought two types of tyre to the race; two dry compounds (soft "options" and medium "primes"). The Medium compound was distinguished by a white-band with the Soft compound being denoted by a yellow-band. The rules of the 2012 Grands Prix stipulated that all cars should use both types of tyre during the race unless the driver used any one of the two wet-weather compounds. Each driver was limited to eleven sets of dry tyres for the weekend. The drag reduction system (DRS) had two activation zones for the race; one was on the straight between turns seven and eight and the second on the straight linking turns ten and eleven.

Heading into the eighteenth race of the season, Red Bull driver Sebastian Vettel led the Drivers' Championship with 240 points, ahead of championship rival Fernando Alonso on 227 points and Kimi Räikkönen with 173. Vettel's teammate Mark Webber was in fourth place on 167 points and Lewis Hamilton was a close fifth on 165 points. Red Bull were leading the Constructors' Championship with 407 points; Ferrari (316 points) and McLaren (306) were vying for second place. Lotus were fourth on 288 points and Mercedes were a further one-hundred and fifty two points adrift in fifth. The championship had so far been tumultuous, with seven different drivers winning the first seven races of the season. Räikkonen, his Lotus teammate Romain Grosjean, along with Sergio Pérez and Felipe Massa had finished in second and both Michael Schumacher and Kamui Kobayashi had finished in third.

After finishing in second place behind Vettel in the Indian Grand Prix Alonso stated it was crucial that he stayed within reach of the Red Bull team and hoped his Ferrari team would finish strongly and not become inflicted with mechanical failures. Despite winning the last four Grands Prix Vettel felt that his lead in the Drivers' Championship remained "vulnerable" and did not believe his Red Bull team had proven themselves as the fastest in the field.

Some teams made modifications to their cars in preparation for the event. Williams drivers Bruno Senna and Pastor Maldonado tested a new front wing during the Friday practice sessions which had three small flaps on its upper section but opted to run an older specification for qualifying and the race. Ferrari introduced upgrades for the F2012 as part of a strategy to remain in contention for the championship. The upgrades included a new front-wing which had new main planes. flap and endplates installed along with a revised front wing and the car's forward bargeboards were modified. Ferrari were allowed to break one of their four allocated curfews on the Thursday night before the race to allow mechanics to fit the updates onto the team's car. The team broke their second curfew one day later when a team member walked into the Ferrari garage early by mistake and did not work on both cars. Mercedes continued to evaluate a new "double DRS" system. Force India introduced a new chassis for Paul di Resta who had struggled with handling issues with his previous monocoque. Caterham revised their chassis which had modified exhausts, bodywork, new front brake ducts, revisions to their floor, diffuser and front wing to stay with Marussia in their battle for tenth place in the Constructors' Championship.

Practice and qualifying
Three practice sessions (two on Friday and a third on Saturday) were held before the main Sunday race. The Friday afternoon and evening sessions each lasted ninety minutes. The third session was held on Saturday afternoon and lasted an hour. Conditions were hot and dry for the Friday practice sessions with air and track temperatures falling as sunset emerged meaning lap times were faster in the evening. Drivers had to cope with a tailwind between turns eight and nine. Hamilton set the pace in the first practice session with a lap of one minute and 43.285 seconds on medium compound tyres, three-tenths of a second quicker than teammate Jenson Button in second. Vettel was third fastest with his Red Bull teammate Webber in fifth; they were sandwiched by Alonso. Michael Schumacher, Maldonado, Nico Rosberg, Valtteri Bottas and Räikkönen rounded out the top ten fastest drivers of the session. Pérez ran wide at the pit lane entry onto the run-off area whilst turning right and attempting a full-speed race entry but avoided contact with the barriers with twelve minutes of the session remaining. In the second practice session, Vettel set the fastest lap of the day with a time of one minute and 41.751 seconds which was recorded late in the session; Hamilton finished with the second-fastest time and traded the fastest lap with Vettel. His teammate Button was third quickest, with Webber fourth despite losing time towards the end of the ninety-minute period with a kinetic energy recovery system (KERS) cooling leak. Grosjean was fifth and his Lotus teammate Räikkönen took sixth. The two Ferrari drivers were seventh and eighth (with Alonso ahead of Massa). Maldonado and Pérez followed in the top ten.

Conditions remained hot and dry for the Saturday afternoon practice session. Hamilton set the fastest lap of the third session at one minute and 42.130 seconds on soft compound tyres, nearly three-tenths of a second faster than teammate Button. Vettel was in his garage for fifty-five minutes because his mechanics rectified a problem with his brake callipers; he managed to do one flying lap with the fastest time in the track's second sector to secure the third quickest-time overall. Vettel's time meant his teammate Webber was fourth and Nico Hülkenberg fifth. Grosjean was fifth in the faster of the two Lotus cars despite losing track time as his brakes were bled in the pit lane. Maldonado took seventh having led the timesheets early in the session. Alonso, Räikkönen and di Resta completed the top ten ahead of qualifying. At the end of the session, Webber was driving slowly into the pit lane when Räikkönen closed towards the Red Bull driver who took evasive action to avoid a collision.

The qualifying session held on Saturday evening was split into three parts. The first part ran for twenty minutes and eliminated the cars that finished the session eighteenth or lower from qualifying. During this session, the 107% rule was in effect, which necessitated each driver set a time within 107% of the quickest lap to qualify for the race. The second part of qualifying lasted fifteen minutes and eliminated cars that finished in positions eleven to seventeen. The final part of qualifying determined the positions from first to tenth and decided pole position. Cars which competed in the final session of qualifying were not allowed to change tyres before the race; these started the race fitted with the tyres with which they set their quickest lap times. Hamilton set the fastest time in all three sessions and clinched his sixth pole position of the season with a lap of one minute and 40.630 seconds. He was joined on the front row of the grid by Webber who recorded a time three-tenths of a second off Hamilton's pace. Vettel secured third position but was ordered by Red Bull via radio to stop on his in-lap because his car was running low on fuel. Officials from Formula One's governing body the Fédération Internationale de l'Automobile were unable to extract a one-litre fuel sample required for analysis and Vettel was moved to the back of the grid. As a result, every driver who qualified behind Vettel was promoted one position. Maldonado inherited third and avoided elimination in the second part of qualifying and adjusted his balance for the final part of the session. Räikkönen started fourth and said his qualifying session was "good".

Race

The race started at 17:00 GST (UTC+4). Most of the drivers started on the soft compound tyres with Vettel, Schumacher and Senna starting on medium compound tyres. Red Bull elected to start Vettel in the pit lane after taking his car out of parc fermé and changed his gear ratios along with his suspension as well as the creation of a low-drag aerodynamic setup to allow overtaking easier for the driver. de la Rosa did the same when a thread on a rear tyre blanket got tangled on his car at the start of the formation lap. As the five red lights went out to signal the start of the race, Hamilton maintained his pole position advantage heading into the first corner. Räikkönen made a quick start and passed Webber and Maldonado to run in second. Force India teammates Hülkenberg and di Resta, along with Grosjean and Senna tangled heading into the first corner. Hülkenberg was forced to retire, while di Resta and Grosjean pitted at the end of the first lap for repairs; Grosjean for a replacement for a right-front punctured tyre. Alonso made a good start when he passed Button and overtook Webber after he got a run on the Red Bull after leaving turn nine. At the completion of the first lap, Hamilton led from Räikkönen, Maldonado, Alonso, Webber, Button, Massa, Kobayashi, Pérez, Schumacher, Ricciardo, Rosberg, Vergne, Glock, Kovalainen, Petrov, Pic, Karthikeyan, Senna, Vettel, de la Rosa, Grosjean and di Resta.

Hamilton complained of cold tyres and locked up heading into turn eight on lap two allowing Räikkönen to gain advantage but Hamilton withstood pressure from the Lotus driver to retain the lead. Vettel had made early progress passing the HRT's, Marussia and Caterhams, but his early progress came at the expense of his right-front wing endplate when he made contact with Senna's left-rear at turn eight switchback on the same lap. Hamilton regained the optimum temperature needed for his tyres and began to pull away from Räikkönen after setting a fastest lap of the race. Alonso closed the gap to Maldonado in second place with the use of DRS in the main straights but was unable to close sufficiently to feign an overtaking manoeuvre because the Williams was fast in a straight line. Vettel chose not to pit for the time being, as the race was interrupted by the intervention of the safety car on lap nine. Rosberg was in the process of overtaking Karthikeyan when Karthikeyan's car began to fail with his hydraulic pressure which caused his steering to become heavy. Rosberg, caught unawares by Karthikeyan's troubles, was launched over the back of the HRT and into the barrier, and scattered debris onto the circuit. Rosberg and Karthikeyan were unhurt. During the safety car period, Vettel was forced to pit when he swerved to avoid Ricciardo and crashed into the polystyrene bollard marking the start of the DRS zone, further damaging his wing. Red Bull took the opportunity to pit him early, with the downside being that Vettel would have to do 42 laps on the soft tyre when supplier Pirelli predicted they could only do 36.  Vettel's car was also installed with a replacement front wing.

Racing resumed at the end of lap 14 when the safety car drove into the pit lane with Hamilton leading Räikkönen. Alonso drove slower than Webber, allowing the Red Bull drive to run alongside Alonso, but the Ferrari driver maintained third position. Vettel moved up to 19th place after he overtook di Resta and de la Rosa. Hamilton again started to pull away from Räikkönen. Vettel started to battle Grosjean for 17th position and during an overtaking manoeuvre, Vettel drove off the racing line and onto the run-off area, and was required to give 17th back to Grosjean to avoid being issued with a penalty. Vettel came back onto the circuit and passed Grosjean to take over the position. Alonso began to close the gap to Maldonado who was running slower allowing Räikkonen to extend his hold over second place. Vergne allowed Vettel to move into eleventh on lap 20. Hamilton slowed and pulled over to the side of the track with a fuel pressure problem on the same lap, handing the lead to Räikkönen. Alonso passed Maldonado in the second DRS zone by using his KERS system heading into the chicane to move into second one lap later. Webber attempted to pass Maldonado by taking the outside line on lap 23, but the two drivers made contact with Webber spinning onto the run-off area. Both drivers were able to continue and Webber fell down to seventh. When Räikkönen's engineer gave him information over the radio about the gap to second-place Alonso, he responded "Just leave me alone, I know what to do". He later gave his Lotus team T-shirts with the phrase on, after it was widely covered in the media.

On the following lap Maldonado was passed by Button (who took the inside line) for third position, while Vettel moved into the points-scoring positions by passing Ricciardo for tenth on the same lap. Pérez moved in front of Massa for fifth on lap 25, while Vettel passed Schumacher for eighth place on the next lap. Kobayashi made the first scheduled pit stop for tyres on the 26th lap. Webber employed his DRS system on lap 26 on the straight linking turns ten and eleven in an attempt to overtake Massa, and ran on the outside line side-by-side with Massa. Webber ran wide onto the run-off area, and made contact with Massa who was sent into a spin after hitting the kerb at turn twelve. Massa and Schumacher pitted on lap 27 and rejoined in 14th and 15th positions respectively. Alonso pitted for medium compounds tyres on lap 29 and remerged in seventh behind Vettel. On lap 30, Pérez passed Maldonado with the assistance of DRS for fourth place. Maldonado made his pit stop on the same lap and Webber was ordered not to battle Vettel for position. Red Bull called Webber into the pit lane for medium compound tyres on lap 31 allowing Vettel into second. Räikkönen pitted from the lead on lap 32 for medium compound tyres and remained in the lead with Vettel close behind. Button closed the gap between himself and Alonso (after setting a new fastest lap–a 1:46.495–on lap 32) by lap 33 and feigned an overtake at turn 21 but had slight oversteer. Räikkönen began to extend the time gap from himself and Vettel on lap 34 who was preserving the lifespan of his soft compound tyres. Grosjean, fifth, had worn tyres and was caught by di Resta, Pérez and Webber. Vettel was caught into the pit lane by Red Bull for their mechanics to fit a new set of soft tyres and remerged in fourth in front of Grosjean.

On lap 39  di Resta forced Pérez wide at turn 13; as Pérez rejoined the circuit, he cut back across the front of Grosjean and the two made contact at the next corner, which in turn forced Grosjean into the path of Webber who was attempting to drive on the inside line. Grosjean and Webber retired because of damage to their cars and the debris on-track from the accident called for the second safety car period of the race. The safety remained out for three laps, during which marshals cleared the track of debris. Pérez was given a ten-second stop-go penalty by the stewards on the 42nd lap for which he served three laps later. Räikkönen began to rebuild his lead over Alonso once the safety car came in on the end of lap 42. Alonso was also being harried by Button; Button himself was being harried by Vettel in fourth. Vettel was in the tow of Button heading towards turn eight and got a run on the McLaren driver driving into turn eleven but was unable to pass. Button and Vettel's duel allowed Alonso to break free, and he started chasing down Räikkönen in the last five laps. Vettel tried again on lap 48 and took the outside line to attempt a pass heading into turn eleven, but Button defended his position. Four laps later Vettel lined up another passing manoeuvre on Button (who went wide heading into turn ten) by employing his DRS in the run up to turn eleven and passed the McLaren driver around the outside to take over third place.

Alonso drew to within 1.9 seconds of Räikkönen on lap 53, but was unable to get close enough to challenge the Lotus driver, who held on to secure his (and Lotus') first victory of the season, and was the eighth driver to win a race in the 2012 season. Alonso was second, 0.8 seconds behind Räikkönen with Vettel third. Button finished fourth. Maldonado took fifth despite not being able to use his car's KERS after the first safety car period. He was seven seconds ahead of a close group comprising Kobayashi, Massa, Senna and di Resta. Massa closed on the Sauber driver late in the race, who was afflicted with an issue with downshifting and was unable to fully recharge his KERS, and Senna and di Resta reduced the time gap to Massa who maintained their positions throughout the remainder of the race. Ricciardo held off Schumacher in the final five laps to secure the final points-scoring position in tenth. Vergne was classified in twelfth place, with Kovalainen, Glock, Pérez, Petrov and de la Rosa the last of the classified finishers.

Post-race
The top three drivers appeared on the podium to collect their trophies and in a later press conference. Räikkonen said that he was "very happy" for the Lotus team and himself after a difficult second half of the season. He also stated the development of his car helped to increase his straight line speed although he later revealed that he was using the same car from the Korean Grand Prix. Alonso was pleased with his second-place result but also felt Ferrari was not the most competitive team over the race weekend. He also felt the modifications that Ferrari brought helped him to become quicker. Vettel said that despite starting the race from the pit lane he still believed he could finish in the top three. He also denied that his result was a "surprise" to him and Red Bull as he believed that he was fast enough to catch up to the leaders. During the podium interviews which were conducted by former driver and BBC commentator David Coulthard, Räikkönen and Vettel swore. The swearing which was broadcast on live television prompted an apology from Vettel, and led to the FIA director of communications Norman Howell to write a letter to the teams at the request of FIA president Jean Todt reminding drivers over the issue and stated disciplinary action would be enacted in the future.

Hamilton said that he was disappointed after the race, having been the leader until he retired with a loss of fuel pressure on lap 20. The McLaren driver stated: "I'm gutted; I'd had really good pace all weekend and I feel certain we could have won today." Nevertheless, he also said that he would like to try and win the final two races of the season. Ricciardo said he was mystified as to how Vettel hit a trackside polystyrene board during the safety car period, "I have to look and see if I did anything wrong but he should be watching me. Everyone was doing the same thing, it's exactly what you do under the safety car." Vettel later represented the incident as less important and admitted that Ricciardo caught him off guard, "Maybe I should have paid more attention but I went to the right and I wasn't very lucky that there was the DRS board, which I took head-on."

Classification

Qualifying

Notes
 – Sebastian Vettel, who set a 1:41.073 qualifying time in Q3 and subsequently would have started from third position, was excluded from the qualifying results for violating the rules by not having enough fuel to return to the pits. However, the stewards allowed him to start the race from the last grid position. Red Bull opted to make set-up changes before the race, violating parc fermé regulations, which meant that Sebastian Vettel had to start from the pit lane.

Race

Notes:
 – Pedro de la Rosa failed to start the formation lap when a cord from one of his tyre blankets became caught up in the wheel, and he therefore started in the pit lane behind Sebastian Vettel.

Championship standings after the race

Drivers' Championship standings

Constructors' Championship standings

 Note: Only the top five positions are included for both sets of standings.
 Teams and drivers in bold had a mathematical possibility of winning the title.

See also 
 2012 Yas Marina Circuit V8 Supercar Event

References

Abu Dhabi
2012
Abu Dhabi Grand Prix
Abu Dhabi Grand Prix